Jeremy Maguire (born August 10, 2011) is an American child actor. He is most known for playing Joe Pritchett on the sitcom Modern Family from 2015 to 2020. In 2017, Maguire made his film debut in the drama film I'm Not Here.

Career
Maguire made his acting debut in the ABC series Modern Family as Joe Pritchett. The role was initially played by Pierce Wallace, but the producers wanted an older actor. In 2016, Maguire appeared in a commercial for Tide. Maguire made his feature film debut in I'm Not Here opposite J.K. Simmons and Sebastian Stan.

Filmography

Film

Television

References

External links
 

Living people
American male child actors
21st-century American male actors
Place of birth missing (living people)
American male television actors